Alex Simeon Janvier,  LL.D (born February 28, 1935) is a First Nation artist in Canada. As a member of the commonly referred to "Indian Group of Seven", Janvier is a pioneer of contemporary Canadian Aboriginal art in Canada.

Career 
Alex Janvier was born on Le Goff Reserve, Cold Lake First Nations, northern Alberta, on February 28, 1935 of Dene Suline and Saulteaux descent. At the age of eight, he was sent to the Blue Quills Indian residential school near St. Paul, Alberta, where the principal recognized his innate artistic talent and encouraged him in his art. Alex Janvier received formal art training from the Provincial Institute of Technology and Art in Calgary (now the Alberta University of the Arts) and graduated with honours in 1960. He was one of the first Canadian First Nations artists to train in a professional art school. Immediately after graduation, Janvier took up an opportunity to instruct art at the University of Alberta. In 1966, the federal Department of Indian and Northern Affairs commissioned him to produce 80 paintings. He helped bring together a group of artists for the Indians of Canada Pavilion at Expo 67, among them Norval Morrisseau and Bill Reid. Janvier currently runs Janvier Gallery in Cold Lake, Alberta, with his family.

In 2016, a retrospective exhibition of his work opened at the National Gallery of Canada.  Also, in 2016 Janvier's large mosaic Tsa Tsa Ke Kʼe (Iron Foot Place) was installed at Rogers Place in Edmonton.

Style 
Alex Janvier, the 'first Canadian native modernist,'  has created a unique style of modernist abstraction, his own "visual language," informed by the rich cultural and spiritual traditions and heritage of the Dene in northern Alberta. His abstract style is particularly suited to large-scale works. He makes magic arts and three-dimensional works. Two of his stylistic influences among Western artists are Paul Klee and Wassily Kandinsky, while among Native traditions he is particularly inspired by the abstract patterns of traditional hide-painting, beadwork and quillwork.

Politics 
Alex Janvier signed his paintings with his treaty number from 1966 to 1977 to protest government policies against Aboriginal people. He also makes references to treaty language in the "ironic and allusive" titles of his art, such as "Sun Shines, Grass Grows, Rivers Flow", grounding his abstract art in political conflicts.

Morning Star 
In 1993 a large abstract painting by Janvier, Morning Star, was installed at the river end of the Grand Hall of the Canadian Museum of History, where a seven-storey-high dome rises above the granite floor. Janvier created the painting with the assistance of his son Dean, between June and September. Janvier titled the work Morning Star in reference to the star's use as a direction-finder. He planned the four areas of colour in the outside ring to represent periods in Native history: yellow, for early history in harmony with nature; blue, for the changes brought about by contact with European civilization; red, for revival and optimism; and white for reconciliation and a return to harmony.

Awards 
 2018 Member of the Alberta Order of Excellence
 2008 Mairon Nicoll Visual Art Award, Alberta Foundation for the Arts
 2008 University of Calgary honorary degree, Doctor of Laws
 2008 Governor General's Awards in Visual and Media Arts
 2008 University of Alberta honorary degree (Doctor of Laws)
 2007 Member of the Order of Canada.
 2005 Centennial Medal for outstanding service to the people and province of Alberta.
 2002 National Aboriginal Achievement Award 
 2001 Tribal Chiefs Institute Lifetime Achievement Award.
 2001 Cold Lake First Nations Lifetime Achievement Award.
 1992 Royal Canadian Academy of the Arts.
 1985 Canada/China Cross Cultural Exchange Tour because he made magic and three-dimensional arts

Films and television  
 2005 CBC ArtSpot
 2004 The Sharing Circle, segment featuring Alex Janvier.
 1991 Investment in Art, Alberta Art Foundation, Edmonton, Alberta.
 1991 Echo Des Songes, Arthur Lamothe, Montreal, Quebec.
 1984 Seeing It Our Way: Alex Janvier, CBC Edmonton.
 1983 Our Native Land: Alex Janvier, CBC/CBO.
 1973 Canadian Indian Canvas, Henning Jacobsen Productions, Toronto, Ontario.
 1973 Colours of Pride, National Film Board of Canada.
 1973 Alex Janvier: The Native Artist, Alberta Native Communications Society.

Education 

 2019 Honorary MFA, Alberta University of the Arts, Calgary, Alberta.
 1960 Fine Arts Diploma, Alberta College of Art, Calgary, Alberta.

Collections 
 Alberta Art Foundation, Government of Alberta, Edmonton, Alberta
 Alberta Indian Arts and Crafts Society, Edmonton, Alberta
 AMACO Canada Ltd., Calgary, Alberta
 Art Gallery of Alberta, Edmonton, Alberta
 The Late Helen E. Band Collection, Toronto, Ontario
 The Saidye and Samuel Bronfman Memorial Collection, Montreal, Quebec
 The Canada Council Art Bank, Ottawa
 Canadian Museum of History, Gatineau, Quebec
 Cinader Collection, Toronto, Ontario
 Department of Foreign Affairs and International Trade, Ottawa, Ontario
 Department of Indian Affairs and Northern Development, Ottawa, Ontario
 City of Edmonton, Edmonton, Alberta
 Edmonton Public Schools Board, Edmonton, Alberta
 Esso Oil Resources, Calgary, Alberta
 Glenbow Museum, Calgary, Alberta
 Government of Alberta, Edmonton
 Gulf Oil Resources, Calgary, Alberta
 McMichael Canadian Art Collection, Kleinberg, Ontario
 Mendel Art Gallery, Saskatoon, Saskatchewan
 Montreal Museum of Fine Arts, Montreal, Quebec
 National Gallery of Canada, Ottawa, Ontario
 The Late Lester B. Pearson Collection, Ottawa, Ontario
 Petro-Canada, Calgary, Alberta
 Shell Canada, Calgary, Alberta
 Thunder Bay Art Gallery, Thunder Bay, Ontario
 Toronto Dominion Bank, Toronto, Ontario
 Winnipeg Art Gallery, Winnipeg, Manitoba

References

External links
 Alex Janvier's Official Website
 Seventh Generation Gallery in the Netherlands, Europe, including art of Alex Janvier.
 Morning Star - Gambeh Then’ virtual exhibition from Canadian Museum of History.

1935 births
Living people
20th-century First Nations people
21st-century First Nations people
Artists from Alberta
First Nations painters
Governor General's Award in Visual and Media Arts winners
Indspire Awards
Members of the Alberta Order of Excellence
Members of the Order of Canada
Members of the Royal Canadian Academy of Arts
Saulteaux people